is a 2021 Japanese live-action film based upon the manga series of the same name. It is the fifth and final installment of the Rurouni Kenshin film series and serves as a prequel, depicting Himura Kenshin's origins as the assassin "Hitokiri Battōsai", while exploring his relationship with the woman named Yukishiro Tomoe. As the film was produced simultaneously alongside Rurouni Kenshin: The Final, events in the former are directly referenced in the latter, with Tomoe's brother Enishi appearing due to events that transpired in The Beginning.

Plot
During the Bakumatsu in Kyoto, and a carnage of killings, Himura Kenshin, also called Hitokiri Battosai is a political assassin, who is part of the revolution that is poised to overthrow the Tokugawa shogunate. He joins the Chōshū clan and soon works for their leader, Katsura Kogorō, as an assassin alongside I'izuka, the examiner of executions. During one of the assassinations, a member of the Kyoto wounds Himura in his last moments, much to Himura's confusion.  One evening, as Himura is out having a drink, he steps in to intervene with supposed members of the revolution who demand to be treated as heroes by a woman named Yukishiro Tomoe. Himura is then attacked by an unknown assassin but manages to slay him. In the aftermath, Himura finds Tomoe watching him, and takes her back to his hideout, an inn for Choshu revolutionaries. The next morning, Tomoe decides to stay and work at the inn. He is stunned particularly when she questions and twists his philosophy on who he chooses to kill.

When Katsura is informed of Himura's new relationship, he questions Tomoe's impact on him. During the Ikedaya incident (1864), an armed encounter between the shishi which includes masterless samurai (rōnin) formally employed by the Chōshū and Tosa clans, and the Shinsengumi, the Bakufu's special police force at the Ikedaya Inn in Sanjō-Kawaramachi, Kyoto, Himura rushes to the site to protect the Choshu and rescue Katsura but is delayed by the Shinsengumi captain Okita Sōji. Himura and the Choshu are forced to withdraw from the area. Before Katsura also goes into hiding, he arranges for Kenshin and Tomoe to hide in the village of Otsu, outside Kyoto, asking Tomoe to look after Himura and pretend to act as husband and wife so that Himura would not be suspected.

During their time in the village, Himura learns to be a farmer and starts to understand the meaning of peace and happiness. One day, when Himura is out, Tomoe's brother, Enishi, comes to meet his sister, revealing both as spies working for the Yaminobu who are pro-shogunate and have been planning to entrap and kill Battosai this whole time. Tomoe refuses to continue working with them, and asks Enishi to return home to Edo, causing Enishi to run off in anger. When Himura returns, he learns from Tomoe that she was previously engaged to be married, however her fiancée was assassinated before the wedding. Himura consoles her and tells her that she has done enough and that she should no longer carry the pain. As they bond as husband and wife, Himura promises her that he will find a way to stop killing in the new age and that he will protect her happiness.

The next day, Tomoe meets with the leader of the Yaminobu but she was used as a pawn by them to weaken Himura. Himura goes to the Yaminobu to rescue her. As intended by the Yaminobu, Himura is visibly distressed and distracted as he has also found out that Tomoe's fiancée is the member of the Kyoto Watch he had assassinated. Despite his emotional state, he is skillful enough to instinctively fight and defend himself. Upon reaching the leader Tatsumi, Himura has reached his limit and can temporarily neither see nor hear. As Tatsumi is about to defeat Himura, Tomoe intervenes by restraining Tatsumi. Unaware that Tomoe was right in front of him, Himura deals a death blow, killing Tatsumi as well as fatally wounding Tomoe. In her last breath, Tomoe carves another scar on Himura's cheek with her dagger, thus completing a cross-shaped scar that her fiancée had started, whilst apologizing to him for the pain she has caused.

Shortly after, Katsura visits Himura at the village house to inform him that they found out I'izuka was also a spy. However, he still needs Himura to join them on the battlefield. However, Himura declares that once the new age arrives, he will never kill again. Himura finishes reading Tomoe's diary which explains how she changed from seeking revenge for her fiancée to falling in love with her fiancée's killer and finally resolving to do all she can to preserve him. The film ends with the Battle of Toba–Fushimi (1868) where the Choshu are victorious over their rivals. With the Bakumatsu finished, despite being challenged to a last sword fight by Saito Hajime, Himura abandons his sword as he leaves the battlefield. The narrative tells us that Battosai disappears for the next 10 years on an unknown journey as Japan enters the Meiji era.

Cast

Takeru Satoh as Himura Kenshin
Kasumi Arimura as Yukishiro Tomoe
Issey Takahashi as Katsura Kogorō
Yōsuke Eguchi as Saitō Hajime
Nijirō Murakami as Okita Sōji
Kazuki Kitamura as Tatsumi
Masanobu Ando as Takasugi Shinsaku
Towa Araki as Yukishiro Enishi
Shima Ōnishi as I'izuka
Takahiro Fujimoto as Kondō Isami
Sōkō Wada as Hijikata Toshizō
Mansaku Ikeuchi as Katagai
Mayu Hotta as Ikumatsu
Makiko Watanabe as a landlady
Wataru Ichinose as Sumita
Kinari Hirano as Nakajō
Eita Okuno as Murakami
Eiki Narita as Yatsume Mumyōi
Masataka Kubota as Akira Kiyosato

Production
This fifth entry was produced at the same period of time as the fourth entry. The film started shooting on November 4, 2018, and finished on June 28, 2019. Large-scale shooting for more than 7 months was carried out at 43 locations nationwide, including Kyoto, Nara, Shiga, Mie, Hyogo, Kumamoto, Hiroshima, Tochigi, Saitama, Shizuoka, Osaka, and Nagano. It utilized a total of 6,000 extras. Director Otomo explained: "The goal for me was to portray the humanity and drama of the characters within the fight scenes and action. "The action sequences weren't just action, but rather an important factor in portraying the characters. That is why the main cast, including Takeru, performed almost all of the action sequences without stunt doubles." He added: "I always take acting scenes in one sequence without cuts, and the action scenes in this film were basically shot with the same approach." The director added that while it might be "difficult" for his cast to do the stunts themselves he felt it made the action scenes "more emotional" as a result.

Takeru Satoh has portrayed the character of Kenshin Himura since 2012, and has been doing all his own stunts since he first took on the role. Kenshin is an expert in "Hiten Mitsurugi-ryu," a sword technique that allows the fighter to attack multiple assailants at once. And, keeping in line with the source material, Satoh is regularly put up against multiple actors that he has to fend off through a series of intricately detailed moves in all five films. Embodying his samurai character, Satoh reportedly spent weeks perfecting the sword fights with choreographers, going through the moves multiple times both in and out of costume in a studio before heading out on set. Kasumi Arimura expressed pressure about her work due to the expectations given to her further appearances in The Beginning as she only appeared in flashbacks in the previous movie as well as how different it is. In retrospect, she found it an interesting experience even if her role was smaller than other fellow actors. Among her favorite experiences involve her daily life with Kenshin as a married couple as the two work with a camp filled with plants.

The theme song "Broken Heart of Gold" is performed by One Ok Rock.

Release
Rurouni Kenshin: The Beginning was released in Japanese theatres on June 4, 2021. All five films in the Rurouni Kenshin series were screened on the 24th Shanghai International Film Festival (SIFF), which was held on June 11–20, 2021. Rurouni Kenshin was the first Japanese live action series invited to be screened in Movie Franchise Section in Shanghai International Film Festival, which was newly established in 2016, while only Hollywood blockbuster franchises have been invited before. This was also the international premiere of The Final and The Beginning. The Beginning was released on Netflix globally on July 30, 2021.

In Japan, the film was released on digital platforms on October 20, 2021, and on Blu-ray and DVD on November 10, 2021.

Reception
Rurouni Kenshin: The Beginning opened in the first place at the Japanese box office, selling 350,000 tickets for over 508 million yen (about US$4.7 million) in its opening weekend. Rurouni Kenshin: The Final ranked at #2 that weekend, making Rurouni Kenshin the first franchise to take the top two spots at the Japanese box office in the same weekend. In total, the film has grossed $21,318,560 at the Japanese box office.

Anime News Network acclaimed the acting of the lead actors as well as the handling of fights, stating that the film should be watched before The Final due to spoilers. LeisureByte commented that while Kenshin's character is too stoic in this movie, he becomes a more complex character when exploring his work and romance. However, the length of the film was a subject of criticism as newcomers might be bored by the pacing. Asian Movie Pulse praised the darker take on Kenshin's character due to the way he works as an assassin but noted his romance with Tomoe made the plot more interesting which is made more impactful thanks to the acting of Satoh and Arimura. Ani Radio Plus praised the fight sequences for being surprisingly violent in contrast to previous films as it might shock returning viewers to see Kenshin's coldblooded actions and the amount of gore caused by them. Fiction Horizon found it as fitting finale to live-action series due to the handling of Kenshin's nature and how he changes across the narrative.

See also
 Rurouni Kenshin: Trust & Betrayal (1999), an  original video animation adaptation of the same storyline.

References

External links
Official website

2021 films
Films set in 1864
Films set in 1868
Films directed by Keishi Ōtomo
Films postponed due to the COVID-19 pandemic
Films scored by Naoki Satō
Films set in Bakumatsu
Films shot in Hiroshima
Films shot in Japan
Films shot in Kyoto
Films shot in Osaka
Japanese sequel films
Live-action films based on manga
Rurouni Kenshin films
Samurai films
Uxoricide in fiction
Warner Bros. films
2010s Japanese films